Dolichostoma is a genus of bristle flies in the family Tachinidae. There are about five described species in Dolichostoma.

Species
These five species belong to the genus Dolichostoma:
 Dolichostoma alpinum Townsend, 1912 c g
 Dolichostoma andinum (Townsend, 1927) c g
 Dolichostoma arequipae (Townsend, 1912) c g
 Dolichostoma nigricaudum Blanchard, 1963 c g
 Dolichostoma puntarenensis (Townsend, 1928) c g
Data sources: i = ITIS, c = Catalogue of Life, g = GBIF, b = Bugguide.net

References

Further reading

External links

 
 

Tachinidae